Kreidler, a German manufacturer of motorcycles
Kreidler may also refer to:
 Kreidler, a band from Germany
 Kreidler, an eponymous album by band Kreidler
Kreidler (surname)